Eriogonum mohavense is a species of wild buckwheat known by the common name Western Mojave buckwheat. It is endemic to the Mojave Desert of California. The woolly, rounded leaves are located around the base of the stem. The branches of the inflorescence produce many small clusters of tiny yellow flowers.

References

External links
Jepson Manual Treatment
Photo gallery

mohavense
Endemic flora of California
Flora of the California desert regions
Natural history of the Mojave Desert
Plants described in 1877